Fowlmere is one of the southernmost villages in Cambridgeshire, England. The population of the civil parish at the 2011 Census was 1,206.

History 
The village has an ancient landmark called the ‘Round Moat’, which is the remains of an early Saxon settlement dating from around the ninth century.

The Census Records from 1841 to 1891 can be found in the Cambridge Record Office. In addition the 1851 Census for Fowlmere is available in full transcript form, on microfiche, from the Cambridgeshire Family History Society Bookstall.

The village was struck by an F1/T2 tornado on 23 November 1981, as part of the record-breaking nationwide tornado outbreak on that day.

Village life 
Fowlmere has one pub, The Chequers that has operated since the 16th Century. It served as a coaching inn for travellers going into and from Cambridge and was even used as coffin storage for those travelling with bodies. It was notably mentioned in the diary of Samuel Pepys, which is regarded as an important historical English diary. Nowadays, the pub serves as a local bar and restaurant that takes in patrons from many nearby villages.

Fowlmere has no general convenience shop, but does have a small business park that houses several business.

There are three main fields in Fowlmere: One next to the school, one behind the church and one by the Village Hall. They are regularly used by locals for recreation and are maintained by the local council.

School 
Fowlmere has one school, Fowlmere Primary School which educates around 100 students a year. It is an extension of an old school building that has been used since its founding in 1861. It teaches pupils aged 4–11 (years reception to 6) and attracts pupils from both Fowlmere, Thriplow and nearby Great Chishill as it does not have a Primary school of its own. The site lies opposite 'The Butts' which is a field and neighbourhood at the edge of the village. The school forms a large part of the community, as most of the children in the small village grow up around it.

Airfield 

Fowlmere Airfield opened in late-1916 as an emergency landing ground for 75 (Home Defence) Squadron of the Royal Flying Corps, who had their HQ in Bedford and dispersed their three flights to Yelling (St Neots), Old Weston (Thrapston) and Therfield (Baldock) on anti-Zeppelin duties. Its purpose was to receive aircraft lost, out of fuel or with engine troubles and was staffed with a minimum number of personnel whose prime task was to light flares to aid pilots in finding the site. It closed down after WW1.

As RAF Fowlmere, near the edge of the village, it was the location for the RAF Station and transferred to the United States Army Air Force (USAAF) for use by their 339th Fighter Group during World War II.  The Group flew its first combat mission on 30 April 1944, and its last on 21 April 1945.  Modern Air was established at the airfield during September 1990 by Derick Gunning and Anna McDowell.  Now the airfield provides pilots with self-fly Piper aircraft and servicing, as well as PPL training.

 ICAO: EGMA
 Runway Length: 
 Runway Surface: Grass
 Aircraft for hire (2009): 4
 PPR for visiting: 01763 208281
 Fowlmere radio: 135.705 MHz

Natural history

The Fowlmere nature reserve (maintained by the RSPB) is situated west of the village, between it and the village of Melbourn. With  of nature trails, it attracts many visitors. Several special birds are seen there, including: kingfishers, water rails, and grasshopper warblers.

Fowlmere, along with several other Cambridgeshire villages, lays claim to a sighting of the infamous Fen Tiger, a supposed wild big cat.

See also
Thriplow

References

External links

 Fowlmere's airfields
 Modern Air
 Fowlmere Nature Reserve
 Fowlmere Primary School

 
Villages in Cambridgeshire
Civil parishes in Cambridgeshire
South Cambridgeshire District